David J. Schow (born July 13, 1955) is an American author of horror novels, short stories, and screenplays.

His credits include films such as Leatherface: The Texas Chainsaw Massacre III, The Crow and The Hills Run Red. Most of Schow's work falls into the subgenre splatterpunk, a term he is sometimes credited with coining. In the 1990s, Schow wrote Raving & Drooling, a regular column for Fangoria magazine. All 41 installments were collected in the book Wild Hairs (2000), winning the International Horror Guild's award for best non-fiction in 2001.

In 1987, Schow's novella Pamela's Get was nominated for a Bram Stoker Award for best long fiction. His short story Red Light won the 1987 World Fantasy Award for Best Short Fiction. And in 2015, The Outer Limits at 50 won the Rondo Award for Book of the Year in a tie with The Creature Chronicles by Tom Weaver, of which Schow was a contributor.

As an editor, Schow's work includes three volumes of writings by Robert Bloch and a book of short stories by John Farris.

Schow has also been a past contributor to liner notes for cult film distributors Grindhouse Releasing/Box Office Spectaculars, notably on the North American DVD release of Italian filmmaker Lucio Fulci's horror film, Cat in the Brain. He has also written text supplements for the DVDs of Reservoir Dogs and From Hell, and has done DVD commentaries for The Dirty Dozen, The Green Mile, Incubus, Thriller and Creature from the Black Lagoon. An upcoming Blu Ray and DVD edition of season one of The Outer Limits features commentary by Schow on several episodes as well as a booklet essay written by him.

Bibliography

Novels
 The Kill Riff (1988)
 The Shaft (1990)
 Rock Breaks Scissors Cut (2003)
 Bullets of Rain (2003)
 Gun Work (2008)
 Hunt Among the Killers of Men (2010) (under the pseudonym "Gabriel Hunt")
 Internecine (2010)
 Upgunned (2012)
 The Big Crush (2019)

Short story collections
 Seeing Red (1990)
 Lost Angels (1990)
 Black Leather Required (1994)
 Crypt Orchids (1998)
 Eye (2001)
 Zombie Jam (2005)
 Havoc Swims Jaded (2006)
 A Little Aqua Book of Creature Tails (2014) 
 DJSturbia (2016) 
 DJStories: The Best of David J. Schow (2018) 
 Monster Movies (2020) 
 Weird Doom (2021) 
 Suite 13 (forthcoming)

Non-fiction
 The Outer Limits: The Official Companion (1986) (with Jeffrey Frentzen) 
 The Outer Limits Companion (1998)
 Wild Hairs (2001)
 The Art of Drew Struzan (2010) (with Drew Struzan) 
 The Outer Limits at 50 (2015) 
 The Ultimate Outer Limits Companion (forthcoming)

As editor
 Silver Scream (1988)
 The Lost Bloch Volume 1: The Devil with You (1999)
 The Lost Bloch Volume 2: Hell on Earth (2000)
 The Lost Bloch Volume 3: Crimes and Punishments (2002)
 Elvisland (2003) (by John Farris)

Screenplays
 Freddy's Nightmares—"Safe Sex" (1989)
 A Nightmare on Elm Street 5: The Dream Child (1989) (uncredited)
 Leatherface: The Texas Chainsaw Massacre III (1990)
 Critters 3 (1991)
 Critters 4 (1992)
 The Crow (1994)
 The Outer Limits—"Corner of the Eye" (1995)
 The Outer Limits—"The Voice of Reason" (1995) (excerpts)
 Perversions of Science—"The Exile" (1997)
 The Hunger—"Red Light" (1997)
 The Texas Chainsaw Massacre: The Beginning (2006)
 Masters of Horror—"Pick Me Up" (2006)
 Masters of Horror—"We All Scream for Ice Cream" (2007)
 The Hills Run Red (2009)
 Mob City —"His Banana Majesty" (2013)
 Creepshow —"The Finger" (2019)
 Creepshow —"Bunny Didn't Tell Us" (2021) (unaired) 
 Creepshow —"Mums" (2021) (with Greg Nicotero) (based on a story by Joe Hill)

See also
List of horror fiction authors

References

Further reading
S. T. Joshi. "David J. Schow and Splatterpunk" in Joshi, The Evolution of the Weird Tale. NY: Hippocampus Press, 2004, 190–202.

External links
 

David J. Schow on Twitter

1955 births
20th-century American novelists
21st-century American novelists
American horror writers
American male novelists
German emigrants to the United States
Living people
Splatterpunk
World Fantasy Award-winning writers
American male short story writers
20th-century American short story writers
21st-century American short story writers
20th-century American male writers
21st-century American male writers
American television writers
American male television writers
American male screenwriters